Jonesboro is a city located on Crowley's Ridge in the northeastern corner of the U.S. State of Arkansas.  Jonesboro is one of two county seats of Craighead County.  In 2023, the city had a population of 81,969 and was the fifth-largest city in Arkansas at the time. In 2023, the Jonesboro metropolitan area had a population of 135,287 and a population of 179,932 in the Jonesboro-Paragould Combined Statistical Area.

Jonesboro is the home of Arkansas State University and is the cultural and economic center of Northeast Arkansas.

History

The Jonesboro area was first inhabited for thousands of years by indigenous peoples. At the time of European encounter, historic tribes included the Osage, the Caddo, and the Quapaw. The name of the state of Arkansas comes from the Quapaw language. French and Spanish traders and trappers had relations with these groups.

After the United States acquired this territory in the Louisiana Purchase of 1803, American settlers eventually made their way to the area where Jonesboro is located. They began exploring, hunting, trapping, and trading with the local Indian tribes. A permanent settlement of Jonesboro was set up shortly after 1859. When Craighead County was established.

In 1859, land was taken from nearby Greene, Mississippi, and Poinsett counties and was used to form Craighead County. Jonesboro was designated as the original county seat. As the population increased in the west of the county, Lake City was named as the second seat. Jonesboro had 150 residents in 1859. It was named after State Senator William A. Jones in recognition of his support for the formation of Craighead County. Originally spelled Jonesborough, the city name was later shortened to its present-day spelling.

The Jonesboro Lynching of 1881 took place at midnight on March 12. The Decatur Daily Republican reported that four black men—Green Harris (sometimes referred to as Hawes), Giles Peck, John Woods (sometimes referred to as Jud Woods), and Burt Hoskins (sometimes referred to as Haskins)—had been arrested and tried before magistrates Jackson and Akers at New Haven Church, eight miles north of Jonesboro. The hearing, which found that the men were guilty, was attended by several hundred people. According to this and several other reports, the accused made a complete confession. The magistrates bound them over to the grand jury, and they were ordered taken to the jail in Jonesboro. The hour being late, however, it was decided to hold them overnight in the church under a strong guard. The large crowd gradually dispersed, "muttering threats of vengeance." Around midnight, between 200 and 300 masked men surrounded the church, overpowered the guards, and broke in the doors and windows. They seized the accused, dragged them to a tree about 200 yards away, and hanged them. Once again, the crowd dispersed, "leaving the bodies of their victims dangling in the air and presenting a horrible spectacle in the moonlight." According to the Republican, "The crime and punishment form one of the blackest pages in the annals of the state."

During the late 19th century, the city tried to develop its court system and downtown infrastructure. Shortly after the city was named county seat, the highest point in Jonesboro was identified and a courthouse was planned for construction. This was delayed for several years, for the locals did not want to ruin their deer hunting. The first courthouse was finally completed but was destroyed by a fire in 1869. A store across from this site was rented and used as a courthouse. It was destroyed in an 1876 fire. Another building was constructed on the same site, but it fell to a fire in 1878, a major one that destroyed most of downtown Jonesboro. Soon afterward, another courthouse was constructed; it was replaced by the present courthouse in 1934.

The St. Louis Southwestern Railway, known as the Cotton Belt Railroad was constructed through Jonesboro, with its tracks passing just north of the center of the city. During the first train's journey, it became stuck and supplies had to be carried into town. It connected St. Louis to points in Arkansas and Texas. Other major railways began to construct tracks to and from Jonesboro, including the St. Louis–San Francisco Railway and Missouri Pacific Railroad. Some of the rail companies still own and use the tracks that run through Jonesboro.

The city set up the Jonesboro School District in 1899. In 1900, St. Bernard's Regional Medical Center was established by the Olivetan Benedictine Sisters. The Grand Leader Department Store, the first department store in the city, was opened in 1900. Woodland College and two schools within the Jonesboro School District were opened in 1904. Arkansas State College (now Arkansas State University) was established in 1909, a year in which the first horseless carriages were driven in the city. There is a recording on a Sanborn Fire Insurance Map dating back to March 1897 of a Presbyterian Church existing at the corner of Church St. and Monroe, and a Christian church located at the corner of Union and Huntington Ave. Other early churches of the city were started in the 1910s. First Baptist Church was founded in 1911, and First Methodist Church in 1916.

Wade Thomas was lynched on December 26, 1920, in downtown Jonesboro. A large white mob seized Thomas after he allegedly shot local Patrolman Elmer Ragland during a Christmas Day raid on a local dice game. He was paraded through the town and then hanged and his body riddled with bullets. 

On September 10, 1931, Governor Harvey Parnell authorized the Arkansas National Guard to be deployed in Jonesboro to quell the Church War, a clash between the followers of Joe Jeffers and Dow H. Heard, the pastor of the First Baptist Church of Jonesboro. Jeffers' supporters also attacked the mayor and police chief, resulting in front-page coverage of the incident in The New York Times.

On May 15, 1968 an F4 tornado struck Jonesboro, destroying 164 homes. At least 34 people died and more than 350 people were injured as a result of the tornado which struck the town without warning at 10:00pm that night.

On May 27, 1973, shortly after midnight, an F4 tornado struck Jonesboro, killing 3 and injuring 289.   Damage was estimated at 60 million in 1973 dollars.

The Westside School shooting occurred on March 24, 1998. Two young boys (aged 11 and 13 years) fired upon students at Westside Middle School while hidden in woodlands near the school. They killed four students and one teacher, and injured 10 persons.

In the 2007–2008 school year the Jonesboro Public School District elementary schools were reclassified as magnet schools.

2020 tornado
A "large, destructive" EF3 tornado struck Jonesboro on March 28, 2020, causing severe damage to The Mall at Turtle Creek and at least twenty minor injuries, and two severe injuries.

Geography
Jonesboro is located at  (35.828067, -90.694048) atop Crowley's Ridge in northeastern Arkansas.

Climate
Jonesboro has a humid subtropical climate (Köppen climate classification Cfa).

Demographics

It is the principal city of the Jonesboro, Arkansas Metropolitan Statistical Area.

2020 census

As of the 2020 United States census, there were 78,576 people, 29,688 households, and 19,637 families residing in the city.

2013
As of the census of 2013, there were 71,551 people, 26,111 households, and 16,637 families residing in the city. The racial makeup of the city was 74.7% White, 18.4% Black, 0.4% Native American, 1.5% Asian, 0.03% Pacific Islander, 1.0% from other races, and 2.0% from two or more races. 5.2% of the population were Hispanic.

There were 26,111 households, out of which 30.1% had children under the age of 18 living with them, 48.9% were married couples living together, 12.2% had a female householder with no husband present, and 35.4% were non-families. There are 878 unmarried partner households: 776 heterosexual, 50 same-sex male, and 52 same-sex female households. 27.5% of all households were made up of individuals, and 9.0% had someone living alone who was 65 years of age or older. The average household size was 2.47 and the average family size was 2.93.

In the city, the population was spread out, with 22.9% under the age of 18, 16.6% from 18 to 24, 28.1% from 25 to 44, 20.5% from 45 to 64, and 11.8% who were 65 years of age or older. The median age was 32 years. For every 100 females, there were 92.1 males. For every 100 females age 18 and over, there were 88.8 males.

The median income for a household in the city was $32,196, and the median income for a family was $42,082. Males had a median income of $21,633 versus $31,633 for females. The per capita income for the city was $17,884. About 12.9% of families and 23.1% of the population were below the poverty line, including 22.4% of those under age 18 and 12.3% of those age 65 or over.

Economy

The Mall at Turtle Creek, opened in 2006, was the largest mall in northeast Arkansas and was the only enclosed mall constructed in the country that year. The mall closed in 2020 due to tornado damage; currently, the only stores in operation at Turtle Creek are Dillard's, JCPenney, and Target. Before The Mall at Turtle Creek opened, Indian Mall, named for the former mascot of Arkansas State University, was the primary shopping destination in northeast Arkansas. The Indian Mall was demolished in 2012.

In 2012, Kiplinger's Personal Finance ranked Jonesboro ninth of the "10 Best Cities for Cheapskates".

Arts and culture

Points of interest

Craighead Forest Park is a city-owned park located on Crowley's Ridge featuring a 60-acre fishing lake, camping facilities, hiking/biking trails, nature areas, picnic sites and recreational fields. 

Crowley's Ridge Parkway runs through Jonesboro. It was designated one of Arkansas' Scenic Byways in 1997, and it was designated Arkansas' first National Scenic Byway in 1998.

In 2004 the Arkansas Game and Fish Commission opened the 160-acre Forrest L. Wood Crowley's Ridge Nature Center in south Jonesboro, adjacent to Craighead Forest Park. The center includes exhibits on the origins and history of the Ridge, wildlife, educational models and displays, land and water features, hiking trails, an observation tower and an auditorium.

Located on the ASU campus, the Arkansas State University Museum is accredited by the American Association of Museums and features 21,000 square feet of historic, archaeological, and natural history exhibits. The museum focuses on the history and cultural heritage of Northeast Arkansas and the Mississippi River Delta region.

Education

Higher education
Arkansas State University is located in Jonesboro. New York Institute of Technology College of Osteopathic Medicine maintains a second location on Arkansas State University's campus in Wilson Hall.

The Northeast Arkansas Career & Tech Center is also located in Jonesboro.

Elementary and secondary education

There are six public school districts operating within the city limits of Jonesboro:
 Jonesboro School District
 Valley View School District
 Nettleton School District
 Westside Consolidated School District
 Bay School District
 Brookland School District

Prior to School integration in the United States, a separate set of schools was maintained for White and Black children. Booker T. Washington High School provided education for Black children from surrounding areas under contract at until the schools were finally integrated. Jonesboro was a leader in educating African-American Children.

Media

Infrastructure

Transportation

Air service
The region is served by the Jonesboro Municipal Airport.

Public transport
The city is served by the Jonesboro Economic Transit System (JETS). As of 2011, JETS operates three fixed routes, as well as para-transit service for disabled persons.

List of highways

Notable people

See also 
 List of cities and towns in Arkansas
 List of municipalities in Arkansas
 National Register of Historic Places listings in Craighead County, Arkansas

Reference

Further reading

External links

 
 
 
 
 

 
1859 establishments in Arkansas
Cities in Arkansas
Cities in Craighead County, Arkansas
County seats in Arkansas
Jonesboro metropolitan area
Populated places established in 1859
Sundown towns in Arkansas